The Sandiganbayan is a special appellate collegial court in the Philippines that has jurisdiction over criminal and civil cases involving graft and corrupt practices and other offenses committed by public officers and employees, including those in government-owned and controlled corporations. The special court was established by Presidential Decree No. 1486. It was subsequently modified by Presidential Decree No. 1606 and by Republic Acts  7975, 8249 and 10660. It is equal in rank to the Court of Appeals, and consists of fourteen Associate Justices and one Presiding Justice. The Office of the Ombudsman owns exclusive authority to bring cases to the Sandiganbayan.

The Sandiganbayan is housed in the Centennial Building, Commonwealth Avenue, National Government Center, Diliman, Quezon City, Metro Manila.

History 

The Sandiganbayan was established under the administration of President Ferdinand E. Marcos on June 11, 1978, by Presidential Decree No. 1486 in the 1973 Constitution. The court was equal in rank to the Regional Trial Courts (then known as the Courts of First Instance). On December 10, 1978, Presidential Decree No. 1606 elevated the ranking of the Sandiganbayan to match that of the Court of Appeals, the second-highest judicial court in the Philippines. The Sandiganbayan began operations on February 12, 1979.

Amendments were introduced in Republic Acts No. 7975 and No. 8249, after the EDSA Revolution in 1986, which limited the jurisdiction of the Sandiganbayan to "cases involving public officials occupying positions classified as salary grade 27 and higher."

The Sandiganbayan currently sits in seven divisions of three justices each, as per R.A. No. 10660, amending R.A. No. 1606.

Martial law 
When the Sandiganbayan began operations in 1979, it was composed of only one division (with Hon. Manuel R. Pamaran as Presiding Justice and two Associate Justices) and a 15-membered skeleton crew. In 1981, a second division was launched. A third division was formed on August 4, 1982.

Aquino investigation 

In the wake of the assassination of Benigno Aquino, Jr. in August 1983, Ferdinand Marcos submitted the case for an immediate trial to the Sandiganbayan. Marcos' critics, who included business leaders and church leaders, claimed that the Sandiganbayan had no experience in trying a murder and demanded an appointment of an imperial prosecutor and independent judicial body instead.

In 1984, the 26 people accused in the assassination of Aquino were acquitted by the Sandiganbayan in a 90-page verdict. The verdict disregarded all findings of the Agrava Commission, which was appointed to investigate the assassination.

On June 13, 1985, the Sandiganbayan, with the aid of the commission, threw out the case against General Fabian Ver, the chief of the Armed Forces of the Philippines, together with seven other military men. The Sandiganbayan voted for the exclusion of their testimonies in that they were self-incriminatory and inadmissible as evidence. The Supreme Court upheld this decision by a vote of 10–3 in August. Ver was soon reinstated as chief of staff by Marcos on December 2.

Post-martial law

1987 Constitution 

On February 2, 1987, a new constitution was ratified under President Corazon Aquino. The 1987 Constitution established the separation of powers and a system of checks and balances between the executive, legislature, and judiciary branches.

The 1987 Constitution expanded the jurisdiction of the Sandiganbayan to include cases investigated by the Presidential Commission on Good Government (PCGG) involving ill-gotten wealth, instated by Executive Orders No. 14 and No. 14-A (main SB site & EO 14). In April 1994, Imelda Marcos and three former officials of the Ministry of Human Settlements (MHS) were indicted for the misappropriation of Php 97.9 million in MHS funds in 1985. At the same time, however, the Sandiganbayan dismissed charges against Imelda Marcos in connection with the sale of $125.9 million in Central Bank Treasury notes in the 1980s.

Under the 1987 Philippine Constitution and the Ombudsman Act of 1989, the Office of the Ombudsman independently monitors all three branches of the government for political corruption.

Laws on graft and corruption in the Philippines 
Laws on graft and corruption have been in effect as early as the 1950s, before the creation of the Sandiganbayan. Graft and corruption laws govern both public officers and natural persons. The collection of these laws is overseen by the Office of the Ombudsman.

Republic Act Nos. 3019 and 1379 
The Anti-Graft and Corrupt Practices Act is a law that stipulates that the Philippine Government shall repress certain acts of both public officers and the natural persons that may constitute graft or corruption. Acts that are subject under these laws include graft, divulging otherwise private information, negligence in warranted requests, undue injury by a public officer to any party – private or government – in the form of unwarranted benefits or disadvantages.

In the case of unexplained accrual of wealth, R.A. No. 1379 states that a petition may be filed against any public officer who has acquired property unlawfully, be it through graft or any form of corruption. This petition should come from the Solicitor General of the Republic of the Philippines as per complaint by a taxpayer.

Republic Act No. 7080 
Any public officer who amasses a certain amount of ill-gotten wealth (at least fifty-million pesos) through means of criminal acts – be it by himself or in connivance with other, shall be subject to reclusion perpetua or a life sentencing to death. Any accomplice shall be sentenced with the same.

Republic Act. No. 9184 
Under the Government Procurement Reform Act, public officers who commits any of the following who colludes with private individuals performs the following illegal acts in RA 9184 will suffer an imprisonment of not less than six years and one day, but not more than fifteen years.

Jurisdiction 

To determine whether the Sandiganbayan has jurisdiction, lawyers look into two criteria, namely: the nature of the offense and the salary grade of the public official.

The Sandiganbayan shall have original exclusive jurisdiction over:

 Violation of Anti-graft and Corrupt Practices Law (RA 3019)
 Forfeitures of Illegally Acquired Wealth (RA 1379)
 Crimes committed by public officers namely
 Direct, Indirect and Qualified Bribery
 Corruption of public officials
 Other offenses or felonies whether simple or complexed with other crimes committed in relation to their office by public officials.
 Civil and Criminal Cases filed pursuant to and in connection with Executive Orders 1, 2, 14 & 14-A issued in 1986
 Petitions for issuance of Writ of mandamus, prohibition, certiorari, habeas corpus, injunction and other ancillary writs and processes in aid of its appellate jurisdiction; Provided, jurisdiction is not exclusive of the Supreme Court.
 Petitions for Quo Warranto arising or that may arise in cases filed or that may be filed under EO 1, 2, 14 & 14- A

Provided that the accused belongs to a salary grade of 27 or higher, the Sandiganbayan has jurisdiction over:

 Violation of Code of Conduct and Ethical Standards (RA 6713)
 Violation of the Plunder Law (RA 7080)
 Violation of The Heinous Crime Law (RA 7659)
 Violation of The Anti-Money Laundering Law when committed by a public officer (RA 9160)
Presidential Decree 46 referred to as the gift-giving decree which makes it punishable for any official or employee to receive directly or indirectly and for the private person to give or offer to give any gift, present or other valuable thing on any occasion including Christmas, when such gift, present or valuable thing is given by reason of his official position, regardless of whether or not the same is for past favors or the giver hopes or expects to receive a favor or better treatment in the future from the public official or employee concerned in the discharge of his official functions.
 Included within the prohibition is the throwing of parties or entertainment in honor of the official or employee or his immediate relatives.
Presidential Decree 749 which grants immunity from prosecution to any person who voluntarily gives information about any violation of Art.210, 211 or 212 of the RPC, RA 3019, Sec.345 of the NIRC, Sec. 3604 of the Customs and Tariff Code and other provisions of the said Codes penalizing abuse or dishonesty on the part of the public officials concerned and other laws, rules and regulations penalizing graft, corruption and other forms of official abuse and who willingly testifies against the public official or employee subject to certain conditions.

Private individuals can also be sued in cases before the Sandiganbayan if they are alleged to be in conspiracy with the public officer.

The Sandiganbayan is vested with appellate jurisdiction over final judgments, resolutions or orders of the Regional Trial Court whether in the exercise of their original or appellate jurisdiction over crimes and civil cases falling within the original exclusive jurisdiction of the Sandiganbayan but which were committed by public officers below Salary Grade 27.

Composition 
The Sandiganbayan has a total of fifteen departments (two head offices, twelve divisions, and one Legal Research and Technical Staff) and a total of 385 authorized positions. 335 of 385 of these positions are filled.

Electoral procedure 
According to the Presidential Decree No. 1606, Section 1, the Presiding Justice and all Associate Justices shall be appointed by the president, as amended by Republic Act 8249.

Appointment of the Court Officials and other employees, however, is not dependent on the president. According to Rule II, Section 7 of the Revised Internal Rules of the Sandiganbayan, "The Supreme Court shall appoint the Clerk of Court, the Division Clerks of Court and all other personnel of the Sandiganbayan upon recommendation of the Sandiganbayan en banc chosen from a list of qualified applicants prepared in accordance with the Civil Service Law, rules and regulations."

Qualifications 
Presidential Decree No. 1606 further states that "No person shall be appointed Presiding Justice or Associate Justice of the Sandiganbayan; unless he is natural-born citizen of the Philippines, at least 40 years of age and for at least ten years has been a judge of a court of record or been engaged in the practice of law in the Philippines or has held office requiring admission to the bar as a pre-requisite for a like period.

Justices

Division and roles 
The Sandiganbayan originally had three divisions that assisted the Office of the Presiding Justice, according to the Article XIII of the 1973 Constitution. The number of divisions was raised to five divisions in 1995. In 2015, through the Republic Act 10660, under the Aquino Administration, the number of divisions was expanded to seven divisions. Currently, the Sandiganbayan has Office of the Presiding Justice, Office of the Clerk of Court, Legal Research and Technical Staff, seven divisions (Office of the Deputy Clerk of Court), and five other divisions namely Judicial Records Division, Administrative Division, Budget and Finance Division, Management Information System Division, Security and Sheriff Services Division. The functions and roles of these offices and divisions are:

Office of the Presiding Justice – Enjoy precedence over the other members of the Sandiganbayan in all official functions; implements the policies, executes the resolutions and enforces the orders of the Court en banc; performs the functions specifically vested upon him by law, rules and regulations or those implied therefrom; performs all other functions and duties inherent in his position.
Office of the Clerk of Court – The Clerk of Court is the administrative officer of the Sandiganbayan. He shall discharge his functions under the control and supervision of the Sandiganbayan en banc through the Presiding Justice. As administrative officer, he shall take direct charge of the administrative operations of the Sandiganbayan and exercise general supervision over its subordinate officials and employees except those belonging to the staff of the Presiding Justice and the Associate Justices. He shall assist the Presiding Justice in the formulation of programs and policies for consideration and action of the Sandiganbayan en banc. The Clerk of Court shall act as its secretariat and prepare its agenda, minutes of meetings and resolutions.
Legal Research and Technical Staff – Provides legal and technical assistance to the Court by conducting legal research and studies; takes charge of all legal and related matters.
Office of the Deputy Clerk of Court (seven divisions) – Assists the Clerk of Court in providing technical and administrative support and assistance to their particular Division of the Court; takes charge of the pre and post adjudicative matters relative to cases assigned to the First Division.
Judicial Records Division – Takes charge of docketing of cases; plans, implements and evaluates programs for the systematic management of judicial records; and performs other related functions. Prepares entries of judgment; issues copies of decisions, resolutions and orders; maintains a systematic filing and records keeping; and handles the Court's information system, monitoring requests for statistical data.
Administrative Division – Attends to the manpower development and service needs of the Court; and performs all functions relative to administrative and personnel matters. Attends to the procurement and maintenance of the properties, supplies and equipment of the Court, including the Court's physical plant Takes charge of the collection and disbursement of the Court.
Budget and Finance Division – Prepares and executes the budget of the Court; initiates plans and formula for more effective utilization of funds allotted to the Court; fiscalizes the agency's financial interest including disclosure of deficiencies in control needing corrections. Keeps accounting records for the Court; prepares reports required by the Department of Budget and Management, Commission on Audit and other government agencies.
Management Information System Division – Provides technical services related to the planning, development, implementation and maintenance of information systems; takes care of all information and communications technology requirements of the Court.
Security and Sheriff Services Division – In charge of the formulation of plans, implements and evaluates program for the systematic management of security of the Sandiganbayan premises, property and personnel and performs other related functions; takes charge of the formulation of systems for the effective services of Court processes and enforcement of Writs issued by the various Divisions of the Court; serves as liaison office with the various law enforcement agencies and the media regarding all court orders and processes issued by the various divisions of the Court, and other court related matters; takes custody of all accused processing their bail for their temporary liberty and/or to turn-over accused who voluntarily surrenders to the authorized detention centers; oversee that all judicial and extrajudicial proceedings are accomplished; takes charge of the formulation of effective management and implementation of all kinds of court orders or processes and writs coming from the various divisions of the Court.

Cases

Procedures 
The Sandiganbayan holds regular sessions in its principal office in Metro Manila. Sessions may be held outside of Metro Manila when authorized by the Presiding Justice. Cases are heard either en banc or more commonly, by divisions.

Cases are distributed among the divisions through a raffle system. The assignment of a case to a division is permanent, regardless of changes in constitution. Justices may inhibit (i.e., recuse) themselves from a case if they served as Ponente, the Member to whom the Court, after its deliberation on the merits of a case, assigns the writing of its decision or resolution in the case. in the appealed decision of the lower court, or if they or their family members are personally related with the case, or for any other compelling reason. In case of inhibition (recusal) or disqualification, the case will remain with the same division, but the recused justice will be replaced.

Cases may reach the Sandiganbayan either through an appeal from a Regional Trial Court or by original petition filed with the Sandiganbayan. After a case is raffled to a Division, the accused party must be arraigned within thirty days. A pre-trial conference is then held to reach an agreement and issue a pre-trial order. The case is then taken to trial. Following the Speedy Trial Act of 1998, no trial may exceed six months from its starting date. However, the act also allows for certain delays that are excluded from the computed time of trial, including delays caused by other related proceedings involving the accused, absence of the accused or essential witness, and mental or physical incompetence of the accused to stand trial.

Adjudication 
Cases are deemed submitted for decision after the last brief, pleading, or memorandum is filed, or after the deadline for doing so has passed. All adjudicatory action is exercised through the divisions of the Sandiganbayan. The rendition of judgment or final order is based on the unanimous vote of the three Justices in the deciding division. When the Sandiganbayan sits en banc to resolve motions and other incidents, at least eight justices must vote in order to adopt a resolution.

In a joint trial involving multiple cases, a joint or separate judgment may be rendered by the division. In cases involving multiple accused, the division may also render judgment for one or more of the accused by a unanimous vote.

If a unanimous vote cannot be reached in any case, a special division of five will be formed to decide the case by majority vote. Promulgation is done by reading the judgment aloud with the accused present along with any Justice from the deciding division. Decisions are published in the Official Gazette or the official website of the Sandiganbayan.

Appeals 
In general, a party sentenced to any penalty lower than death, life imprisonment, or reclusion perpetua may appeal by filing a motion for reconsideration or a motion for new trial within fifteen days of promulgation of judgment. If a new trial is granted, the previous judgment will be overruled and the new judgment rendered. New trials must also not exceed six months in duration, albeit allowing for certain delays as specified in the Speedy Trial Act. For civil cases, the accused party may file for a petition for a writ of certiorari with the Supreme Court. If the party files an appeal to the Supreme Court, any motion of reconsideration filed to the Sandiganbayan will be deemed abandoned.

If the accused party wishes to appeal from a sentence of life imprisonment or reclusion perpetua, a notice of appeal is filed with the Sandiganbayan and presented to the adverse party. In cases where the Sandiganbayan sentences the accused to death penalty, an automatic appeal follows where the Supreme Court will conduct a review of judgment before the final decision is rendered.

Notable cases

Jinggoy Estrada vs. Sandiganbayan 

In June 2014, plunder charges against former Philippine senator Jinggoy Estrada and several other members of Congress allegedly involved in the pork barrel scam run by Janet Lim-Napoles were filed by the Ombudsman before the Sandiganbayan. Estrada was accused of plundering ₱183 million from the Priority Development Assistance Fund.

Withdrawal of justices 

In December 2014, all three justices of the Sandiganbayan Fifth Division (Associate Justices Roland Jurado, Alexander Gesmundo and Ma. Theresa Gómez-Estoesta) assigned to the case against Estrada recused themselves from the case for "personal reasons". This marked the first time in the court's history that an entire division withdrew from hearing a case. Though the justices refused to elaborate on their reasons for recusal, the withdrawal was said to have been due to "pressure" from the public to deny Estrada's petition for bail.

Imelda Marcos vs. Sandiganbayan 

In 1991, ten counts of graft were filed against former first lady Imelda Marcos before the Sandiganbayan. Marcos was accused of creating private Swiss foundations during her time as governor of Metro Manila, between 1978 and 1984. She was also accused of violating the Anti-Graft and Corrupt Practices Act by holding financial interests in multiple private enterprises. The government has since uncovered Marcos Swiss deposits amounting to $658 million.

Another corruption case against Marcos involving "unlawfully acquired" art collections amounting to $24 million has been brought to the Sandiganbayan by appeals from the Presidential Commission on Good Government and the Office of the Solicitor General. The case is being handled by the Special First Division of the Sandiganbayan.

Delays in court proceedings 

The case against Imelda Marcos has been ongoing for over 26 years due to multiple causes of delay in court proceedings. In 2017, Marcos was absent from what was scheduled to be her last day of trial for the graft case. In the same year, the trial was reset by the Fifth Division due to the failure of the defense to present their last evidence in the case.

Membership

Incumbent justices 
The Sandiganbayan consists of a Presiding justice and twenty associate justices.

Presiding Justice

Associate Justice

Appointed by President Gloria Macapagal-Arroyo

Appointed by President Benigno Aquino III

Appointed by President Rodrigo Duterte

Appointed by President Bongbong Marcos

Divisions

Demographics

By appointing President

By gender

By tenure

Roll of Sandignbayan Justices (1978–present)

The rule of seniority 

The Associate Justices of the Court are usually ordered according to the date of their appointment. There are no official ramifications as to this ranking, although the order determines the seating arrangement on the bench and is duly considered in all matters of protocol. Within the discretion of the Court, the ranking may also factor into the composition of the divisions of the Court.

The incumbent Justice with the earliest date of appointment is deemed the Senior Associate Justice. The Senior Associate Justice has no constitutional or statutory duties, but usually acts as Acting Presiding Justice during the absence of the Presiding Justice. The Senior Associate Justice is not usually designated as the chairperson of the second division of the Court.

The following became Senior Associate Justices in their tenure in the Sandiganbayan:

See also 
2011 Armed Forces of the Philippines corruption scandal
Chief Justice of the Philippines
Constitution of the Philippines
Court of Appeals of the Philippines
Court of Tax Appeals of the Philippines
Political history of the Philippines

Notes

References

Sources 

About the Sandiganbayan

External links 
Sandiganbayan – Official Website
Sandiganbayan – Chan Robles Virtual Law Library – Information on the Sandiganbayan

Courts in the Philippines
1973 establishments in the Philippines
Courts and tribunals established in 1973
Establishments by Philippine presidential decree